The PCT Gazette is a weekly bilingual publication of the World Intellectual Property Organization (WIPO). It is published by the International Bureau of WIPO pursuant to Article 55 of the Patent Cooperation Treaty (PCT), which provides a system for filing international (patent) applications. The Gazette contains among other things bibliographic data of international applications when published and notices concerning changes to fees, legal provisions and Office procedures relating to the PCT. 

The first issue of the PCT Gazette (No 01/1978) was published on May 11, 1978. The PCT Gazette was available both in paper and electronic form (at least during a period) before April 1, 2006. Since April 1, 2006, the Gazette is no longer made available in paper form.

See also 
 Official Journal of the European Patent Office
 European Patent Bulletin
 List of intellectual property law journals

References

External links 
 Weekly Issues of the PCT Gazette, by year on the WIPO web site

Gazettes
Gazette
Publications established in 1978
Works about patent law